The 1961–62 FIBA European Champions Cup season was the fifth season of the European top-tier level professional basketball club competition FIBA European Champions Cup (now called EuroLeague). It was won by Dinamo Tbilisi, after they beat Real Madrid, in the first ever single game EuroLeague Final, by a result of 90–83, in Geneva, Switzerland. For the first time, only one finals game was played, on a neutral court, due to the unstable political situation at the time.

Competition system
European national domestic league champions, plus the then current FIBA European Champions Cup title holders only, playing in a tournament system. The Final was a single game, played on a neutral court.

First round

|}

Round of 16

|}

Automatically qualified to the quarter finals
 CSKA Moscow (title holder)

Quarterfinals

|}

Semifinals

|}

Final

|}

Patinoire des Vernets, Geneva, Switzerland. Attendance:5,000
29 June 1962

Dynamo after the Final

Match Fact File

Awards

FIBA European Champions Cup Finals Top Scorer
 Wayne Hightower ( Real Madrid)

References

External links
 1961–62 FIBA European Champions Cup
 1961–62 FIBA European Champions Cup 
 1961–62 FIBA European Champions Cup
 Champions Cup 1961–62 Line-ups and Stats

FIBA
EuroLeague seasons